Proneomeniidae is a family of uncommon molluscs in the class Solenogastres.

Genera
 Dorymenia Heath, 1911    
 Proneomenia Hubrecht, 1880

References

 
 Simroth, H. (1893). Aplacophora. In: Bronn, H. G.: Die Klassen und Ordnungen des Thier-Reichs. 3 (1): 128-233, pl. 1-4.
 García-Álvarez O. & Salvini-Plawen L.v. (2007). Species and diagnosis of the families and genera of Solenogastres (Mollusca). Iberus 25(2): 73-143

External links
 Salvini-Plawen, L. (2004). Contributions to the morphological diversity and classification of the order Cavibelonia (Mollusca: Solenogastres. Journal of Molluscan Studies. 70: 73-93

Solenogastres